Royal Grammar School may refer to the following schools in England:
 Clitheroe Royal Grammar School, Lancashire
 Colchester Royal Grammar School, Essex
 Lancaster Royal Grammar School, Lancashire
 Royal Grammar School, Guildford, Surrey
 Royal Grammar School, High Wycombe, Buckinghamshire
 Royal Grammar School, Newcastle upon Tyne, North East England
 Royal Grammar School Worcester, previously "RGS Worcester and The Alice Ottley School", Worcestershire
 RGS Dodderhill, an affiliated school

See also
 Royal High School (disambiguation)
 Royal School (disambiguation)